β-Phenylmethamphetamine (N,α-dimethyl-β-phenyl-phenethylamine) is a potent and long lasting stimulant drug.

See also 
 3-Benzhydrylmorpholine
 3,3-Diphenylcyclobutanamine
 Desoxypipradrol

References 

Stimulants
Methamphetamines
Benzhydryl compounds